Uta Bresan (born 9 March 1965 in Dresden, East Germany) is a German schlager / folk singer and television presenter.  Commentators pay tribute to her enduring versatility in both capacities.

Biography 
Uta Bresan was born in Dresden, slightly more than 15 years after the launch of the German Democratic Republic (East Germany).  While still at school she undertook four years of training in classical singing at Dresden's "Musikschule Paul Büttner" ("Paul Büttner Music Academy").  After successful completion of her school career she remained in Dresden in order to study dance and popular music between 1984 and 1988 at the Carl Maria von Weber Music Academy, at the end of which she passed the exams necessary for a performing career with a "Level I" qualification.  She immediately launched herself as a stage singer, appearing with various bands.

Almost at once she went on went on to extend her media experience, with television appearances during 1989 on East German programmes such as the shows "Feuerabend" and "Sprungbrett".  Awards followed quickly, including both a so-called "Silver Bong" prize and the audience award at the 1990 International Schlager Festival in Moscow.  Over the years that followed she made numerous further appearances performed on schlager shows on public service television channels across Germany, especially (though not exclusively) those transmitted during the peak-viewing Saturday evening slots.  The shows in question included Lustige Musikanten, ZDF-Hitparade, Musikantenscheune and ZDF-Fernsehgarten.  Bresan's television music career took off not just in the so-called "Neue Bundesländer" / "new federal states" (before 1990 the "German Democratic Republic" / "GDR"), but also in the western parts of Germany from which, during the first 24 years of Bresan's life, the "GDR" had been brutally separated.

In 1993 the Leipzig-based MDR television broadcaster engaged her to present Tierisch tierisch, a weekly programme concerning domestic pets.  The first 25 minute episode in what has become a very long series was broadcast on 4 January 1994.  She is still hosting the programme as its regular presenter in 2021.

Since 18 January 2004, when she took over the job from Carmen Nebel, Bresan has also moderated television's Saxony-themed music-request show Musik für Sie.

Personal 
Uta Bresan still lives in Dresden, the city of her birth.  She married her long-time partner, the urologist Karsten Freund, in 2001.  The couple's two children were born in 2003 and 2007.

Discography

Albums 
 04/1996: Ich wünsch’ mir mehr …
 05/1999: Zum Horizont und noch weiter
 10/2000: Unbeschreiblich weiblich
 06/2002: Ein Teil von mir
 03/2003: Herzgedanken
 03/2006: Himmlische Augenblicke
 10/2007: Feuer im Vulkan
 03/2008: Solange du willst
 02/2009: Nur die Hits
 10/2009: Mein Weihnachten
 06/2012: Ein gutes Gefühl

Singles 
 01/1993: Ich wünsch’ mir mehr als die Nacht
 05/1993: Super Sommer
 01/1994: Liebe aus der Ferne
 10/1994: Nur, weil ich mich mag 
 01/1996: Tausend und eine Nacht vorbei
 03/1997: Mitten ins Herz
 08/1997: Sehnsucht kannst du nicht verbieten
 06/1998: Feuer im Vulkan
 12/1998: Lass mich noch einmal träumen
 05/1999: Ich will nach Hause zu dir
 11/1999: Ich leb auch ohne dich ganz gut
 04/2000: Ich hab den Sommer bestellt
 10/2000: Liebe ist wie ein Wunder
 03/2001: Balsam auf meiner Seele
 09/2001: Hilf mir an deiner Seite zu geh’n
 04/2002: Kneif mich mal
 03/2003: Du bist der Frühling meines Lebens 
 08/2003: Aus Liebe geboren 
 12/2003: Wenn du mich berührst 
 04/2004: Viva la Vida el Amor 
 09/2004: Gab es uns nur einen Sommer lang 
 06/2005: Sommergefühl
 10/2005: Was man über sie erzählt
 02/2006: Komm doch mal vorbei!
 03/2006: Irgendwann ist alles doch vorüber
 06/2006: Schenk mir diesen Sommer
 10/2006: Wir brauchen Zeit, um zu träumen
 03/2007: Der Himmel schweigt
 07/2007: Komm, lass uns tanzen 
 11/2007: Sie spielen unser Lied 
 03/2008: Wir seh'n uns wieder 
 10/2008: Will nur mal deine Stimme hören 
 02/2009: Du bist nicht allein 
 06/2009: Ab in den Süden (Der Sommer beginnt) 
 11/2009: Ich möchte keinen Tag vermissen 
 11/2009: Wir fliegen mit dem Weihnachtsmann 
 04/2010: Es hat alles seine Zeit 
 10/2010: Kannst du mir verzeihn 
 03/2011: Liebe macht süchtig 
 05/2011: Ich hab’ das Gefühl, der Sommer fängt an 
 10/2011: Einsamer Wolf 
 03/2012: Zum Teufel nochmal 
 06/2012: Ich leb für dich in ihrem Schatten 
 10/2012: Wen würde ich lieben 
 01/2013: Wort für Wort 
 06/2016: Wellenspiel
 05/2017: Kopf oder Zahl
 04/2018: Was wäre wenn

References 

1965 births
Living people
Musicians from Dresden
People from Bezirk Dresden
German women television presenters
German game show hosts
Schlager musicians
German folk singers